Vijaya Kumara was King of Anuradhapura in the 3rd century, whose reign lasted from 247 to 248. He succeeded his father Siri Naga II as King of Anuradhapura and was succeeded by Sangha Tissa I.

See also
 List of Sri Lankan monarchs
 History of Sri Lanka

References

External links
 Kings & Rulers of Sri Lanka
 Codrington's Short History of Ceylon

V
V
V
V